Vasak may refer to:

Vasak Siwni (died 452), Armenian prince, lord of the principality of Syunik
Karel Vasak (1929–2015), French diplomat and writer